The 1909 Western State Normal Hilltoppers football team was an American football team that represented Western State Normal School (later renamed Western Michigan University) during the 1909 college football season. In their third season under head coach William H. Spaulding (who later went on to coach at Minnesota and UCLA), the Hilltoppers compiled a 6–1 record. Tackle John McGuiness was the team captain.

The fall of 1909 was the sixth fall term in the school's history.  By early October 1909, the school had an enrollment of more than 550 students. Dwight B. Waldo was the school's president.

On November 27, 1909, the school held a dinner in honor of the football team. Coach Spaulding was the toastmaster, and President Waldo spoke about "The Event," referring to the football team's victory over Kalamazoo College. The women of the sewing and cooking departments were in charge of the event, including decorations and planning, preparing, and serving the meal.

Schedule

References

Western State Normal
Western Michigan Broncos football seasons
Western State Normal Hilltoppers football